Scythris turanica is a moth species of the family Scythrididae. It was described by Kari Nupponen in 2009. It is found in south-western Kazakhstan. The habitat consists of desert steppes.

Description
The wingspan is about 12 mm. The forewings are creamy white with sparsely scattered pale brown scales over the wing, more densely at the apical area, and forming small indistinct spots at 0.4 below the fold, 0.55 at the middle of the wing and 0.7 near the costa. The hindwings are pale fuscous.

Etymology
The species name refers to the bioregion where the species was first discovered.

References

turanica
Moths described in 2009
Moths of Asia